Semousies is a commune in the Nord department in northern France.

The churchyard contains three Commonwealth war graves from the First World War.

Heraldry

See also
Communes of the Nord department

References

Communes of Nord (French department)